Are You Serious? is the fourth and final full-length release from Chicago-based metalcore band Dead to Fall. It was leaked in early February 2008. It is the band's only studio album with rhythm guitarist Phil Merriman.

Track listing
All songs written by Dead to Fall
"IQ Test" - 0:59
"Stupid?" - 2:22
"The Future" - 4:19
"Sleeping Bag" - 3:18
"Major Rager" - 3:11
"Loch Ness" - 5:08
"Brainmelter" - 4:08
"Cropgrower" - 4:12
"Robo-Destro" - 3:07
"Doombox" - 3:02
"Astral Projection / Dream J(ourney)" - 5:32

Song information

"Stupid?" is a sarcastic take on what the band should be doing at this point in their career, and the music scene they are involved with.
"Sleeping Bag" is about the band's touring van which is still barely functioning.
The lyrics to "Brainmelter" were written by bassist Chad Fjerstad and are heavily influenced by Ken Russell's 1980 film Altered States.
"Cropgrower" was influenced by Jonathan Hunt's time working in the corn fields in Iowa.
"Doombox" is about the female sex organ and the women who use, abuse, and manipulate men with its powers.

Personnel

Dead to Fall
Jonathan Hunt: Vocals
Logan Kelly: Lead guitar
Phil Merriman: Rhythm guitar, Narration on "IQ Test"
Chad Fjerstad: Bass
Timothy Java: Drums

Additional musicians
Arthur Harrison: Theremin

Production
Arranged By Dead To Fall
Produced By Mike Schleibaum
Recorded, Engineered & Mixed By Brian McTernan
Assistant Recording Engineer: Phil Merriman
Digital Editing: Paul Leavitt
Mastered By UE Nastasi

References

Dead to Fall albums
2008 albums
Victory Records albums
Albums produced by Brian McTernan